Line 11 is a northwest–southeast line of the Shanghai Metro network. Since October 2013 Line 11 serves Kunshan city, making it is the second intercity metro in China after the Guangfo Metro and the first that crosses a provincial boundary.  With a single-line mileage of 82.386 kilometers, it is the second-longest single-line subway line in China, after Line 6 in Chongqing, which is 85.6 km long. The line is colored brown on system maps.

History
The line 11 was originally planned to be from Jiading to Nanhui New City, with a total length of 120 kilometers, the south part of the line has been transferred to line 16.

A branch line from  opened on 29 March 2010.

It opened on 31 August 2013.

All new stations except for the Disney Resort station opened on December 19, 2015. The Disney Resort started to trial operation on April 26, 2016.

From January 26, 2020 until March 24, the Kunshan section of line 11 ( to ) was suspended due to the COVID-19 pandemic.

On August 25, 2020, an infill station  was opened.

From February 14, 2022, the Kunshan section of line 11 was again suspended due to the COVID-19 pandemic.

Controversy
Due to the long length of line 11 and high passenger volumes, it is common for line 11 passengers to be forced to stand on the train for their entire trip. In response to this, around early 2014, some passengers that travelled long distances between urban area and the suburban areas of Jiading or Sanlin that cannot bear standing for a long time started bringing their own small folding seats into the carriages. In the following years, the official Weibo of Shanghai Metro reminded passengers involved  phenomenon to be safe and civilized as Shanghai Metro maintains that these foldable seats can be a safety hazard on trains and reduces capacity. Beginning in 2019, line 11 started having announcements in carriages to remind passengers to not bring and use their own seats on the train.

Stations

Service routes

Important stations

Future expansions
In 2023,  will be a transfer station to line 11 of  Suzhou Rail Transit, linking the line with Kunshan in Suzhou.

Yanyu Road station
Although  station is part of the second phase of Line 11, it did not open with the other stations on August 31, 2013. Instead, it has been left as a reserved station under construction that will open in the future pending development in the area.

Baojia line
The planned Baojia line is planned to take over the branch line  - .

Station name change
 On May 7, 2011, Jiyang Road was renamed  (before line 11 began serving the station).

Headways 
<onlyinclude>
<onlyinclude>

Technology

Rolling Stock

References

Shanghai Metro lines
 
Railway lines opened in 2009
2009 establishments in China